Michal Poletín (born June 9, 1991 in Prague) is a Czech professional ice hockey player playing for the club HC Dukla Jihlava .

He has played in the Czech Extraliga with HC Slavia Praha, HC Plzeň, Piráti Chomutov, PSG Berani Zlín and HC Vítkovice Ridera.

References

External links

1991 births
Living people
BK Havlíčkův Brod players
Czech ice hockey forwards
Czech expatriate ice hockey players in Canada
HC Berounští Medvědi players
HC Plzeň players
HC Slavia Praha players
HC Vítkovice players
PSG Berani Zlín players
Piráti Chomutov players
Regina Pats players
Ice hockey people from Prague